Ashot Ariyan (born April 3, 1973) is a Canadian-Armenian composer and pianist. He is the author of more than 25 compositions including an opera-ballet, two symphonies, a piano concerto, two symphonic frescos, and a number of chamber works. His compositions have been performed in concert halls in Russia, Armenia, Belgium, Germany, Spain, Canada and the United States.

Biography
A native of Armenia, he moved to Moscow to continue his education in composition at the Moscow Tchaikovsky State Conservatory, where he graduated with distinction in 2001. A year later, after gaining a master's degree, he became a Teaching Assistant of Prof. Karen Khachaturian at the Moscow Conservatory and taught as a lecturer in Composition and Music Theory.

In 2007, he moved to Canada to complete his doctoral thesis at the University of Montreal, receiving his doctorate in 2013 (doctoral advisor prof. Denis Gougeon). The goal of his doctoral program was to revive the neglected genre of opera-ballet by writing his own work in that medium, entitled “Bilgamesh” (or “Gilgamesh”), in which the archaic Mesopotamian languages Sumerian and Akkadian are used exclusively.

Ashot Ariyan has taught Composition and Music Theory at several music institutions including the Central Music School of Moscow Conservatory (ЦМШ), Moscow Tchaikovsky Conservatory, the University of Montreal, and McMaster University.
 
In 1999, to wide acclaim, Ashot Ariyan performed his own “Concerto-Brevis” for piano and orchestra in the Great Hall of the Moscow Conservatory, accompanied by the Russian Philharmonic Orchestra. In 2009 his symphonic fresco “Sounds of Stonehenge” was performed in Montreal by the UdeM Symphony Orchestra. Later, in January 2011, the same work was performed in Armenia by the National Philharmonic Orchestra and in Moscow by the Moscow State Orchestra. His recent work, Planète X (Un train pour l’enfer II) for seven instruments, was performed in Montreal with great success by the Arkea ensemble in November 2013. Many of his chamber works were first performed at the Moscow Autumn International Music Festival. One of his latest works is a Cycle of 12 Fugues and Postludes for piano, commissioned by the Region of Waterloo Art Fund. In May 2022, a recording company RMN Music has released a “Fugue and Postlude in A” as part of the Modern Music for Piano 4 catalog. In 2016 his music accompanied a presentation of the ballet  "Two Suns" directed by Rudolf Kharatian and dedicated to the Centennial of the Armenian genocide. Starting 2020, the ballet "Two Suns" has periodically been broadcast on the Mezzo TV.

Selected Works and Music Pieces

Academic Publications 
 Ashot Ariyan Bilgamesh, un ballet-opéra en deux actes: symbiose d'un genre oublié, une mythologie archaïque et une langue morte, Saarbrücken, Deutschland: Presses Académiques Francophones, 2015, .

Stage 
Bilgamesh (Gilgamesh) (opera–ballet), 2009–12

Orchestral Music 
Symphony No. 1, 'Manfred', string orchestra, harp, timpani, 1994–96
Concerto-Brevis, piano, orchestra, 1999
Symphony No. 2, 2000–01
Skanda (symphonic fresco no. 1), duduk (oboe from Armenia), orchestra, fixed media, 2002
Sounds of Stonehenge (symphonic fresco no. 2), 2009
Perpetuum Mobile, string orchestra, 2016

Choral Music 
For Armenia (text by Valery Bryusov), mixed chorus, 1997
Deus Lucem, mixed chorus, 2014

Vocal music 
Romance (text by Hovhannes Tumanyan), voice, piano, 1992
Three Taron Songs (text from a folk source from Armenia), mezzo-soprano, piano, 1994
Das Grablied (text by Friedrich Nietzsche), baritone, piano, 2017

Piano Music 
Children's Pieces, 1989, revised 2015
Sonata, 1990
Toccata, Intermedia and Fugue, 1995
Three Pieces, 1997
12 Fugues and Postludes, 2015

Chamber music 
Ballade, clarinet, piano, 1991
Trio, violin, cello, piano, 1993–94
Capriccio, violin, 1997
Amaras, clarinet, cello, piano, 1997
Dedication, cello, 1998
String Quartet No. 1, 1998–99
Resonances, French horn, 2 trumpets, trombone, 2 violins, viola, cello, piano, 2005–06
Dusk, cello, piano, 2007
Planète X. (Un Train pour l'enfer II), 7 players, 2013
Sonata for violin and piano, 2020-21
String Quartet No. 2, 2022

References

Links
Samvel Danielyan A Canadian-Armenian composer Ashot Ariyan about his works, particularly, his opera-ballet “Bilgamesh” Aravot, 2016
Denis Gougeon "Que le soleil soit toujours avec vous" Chapelle historique du Bon-Pasteur

Musicians from Moscow
20th-century classical composers
Armenian composers
Russian people of Armenian descent
Living people
21st-century classical composers
Canadian people of Armenian descent
1973 births